Eugene Williams (August 14, 1932 – December 8, 2008), nicknamed "Fireball", was an American Negro league pitcher for the Memphis Red Sox from 1957 to 1959.

A native of Auburn, Alabama, Williams was the winning pitcher in the 1957 East–West All-Star Game. He died in Oak Ridge, Tennessee in 2008 at age 76.

References

External links
 Eugene Williams at Negro Leagues Baseball Museum

1932 births
2008 deaths
Memphis Red Sox players
Baseball pitchers
Baseball players from Alabama
Sportspeople from Auburn, Alabama
20th-century African-American sportspeople
21st-century African-American people